Hörnle may refer to:
 Hörnle (Swabian Jura), mountain in the Swabian Jura, near Dettingen an der Erms, county of Reutlingen, Baden-Württemberg
 Hörnleberg or the Hörnle, a mountain in the Black Forest, near Gutach im Breisgau, county of Emmendingen
 Hörnle (Ammergau Alps), a mountain in the Ammergau Alps
 Hörnle (Bollschweil), a mountain of Baden-Württemberg
 Hörnle (Münstertal), a mountain of Baden-Württemberg
 Hörnle, the eastern tip of the Bodanrück peninsula in Lake Constance